The 2010–11 Laredo Bucks season was the ninth season of the CHL franchise in Laredo, Texas.

Off-season
It was announced that the Laredo Bucks would be in the Berry Conference the former Southern Conference.

Regular season

Conference standings

Awards and records

Awards

Milestones

Transactions
The Bucks have been involved in the following transactions during the 2010–11 season.

Final roster

See also
 2010–11 CHL season

References

External links
 2010–11 Laredo Bucks season at Pointstreak

L
L